"The Adventure of the Engineer's Thumb", one of the 56 short Sherlock Holmes stories written by Sir Arthur Conan Doyle, is the ninth of the twelve stories collected in The Adventures of Sherlock Holmes. The story was first published in The Strand Magazine in March 1892. Within the narrative of the story, Dr. Watson notes that this is one of only two cases which he personally brought to the attention of Sherlock Holmes.

Synopsis
The story, set in the summer of 1889, mainly consists of a young London consultant hydraulic engineer, Mr. Victor Hatherley, recounting strange happenings of the night before, first to Dr. Watson.

Hatherley had been visited in his office by a man who identified himself as Colonel Lysander Stark. He offered Hatherley a commission at a country house, in Eyford, Berkshire to examine a hydraulic press used, as Stark explains, to compress fuller's earth into bricks. Stark warned Hatherley to keep the job confidential, offering him 50 guineas (£). Hatherley felt compelled to take this work, despite his misgivings, as his business was newly established and he had very little work.

Upon arriving late at night at the appointed train station, Hatherley is met by Colonel Stark and is driven a considerable distance in a carriage with frosted glass windows to the house where he is to examine the machine. (A minor detail is that the house was actually quite near the station; Holmes realizes that the carriage drove "six [miles] out and six back" to disguise the house's location from Hatherley.) Hatherley is still under the spell of the 50 guineas and does not become afraid even when a woman at the house warns him to flee. He is presently shown the press and makes his recommendations as to needed repairs. Then, he rashly decides to inspect the press more closely. His discovery that its floor is covered by a "crust of metallic deposit" confirms his suspicion that the machine is not used for pressing fuller's earth. When he rashly confronts Stark with the knowledge, Stark tries to kill him. He narrowly escapes getting crushed to death when Stark turns the machine on, but he escapes the press with the aid of the woman. Pursued by the murderous Stark, Hatherley is forced to jump from a second-story window, in the process getting his thumb severed by Stark's cleaver. Hatherley survives the fall but passes out in the rose-bushes, coming to hours later by a hedge near the rail station.

Holmes then makes sense of the happenings, recognizing Stark and his allies as counterfeiters (the machine had been to used to press the metal for half crowns; Hatherley's story also helps Holmes solve the mysterious disappearance of another consultant hydraulic engineer a year before, but he, Watson, and the police arrive too late: the house is on fire, and the perpetrators have fled. The press was destroyed when Hatherley's lamp was crushed inside it, setting the machine on fire and ruining the criminals' operation, although they escaped with several "bulky boxes" presumably containing counterfeit coins toward the direction of Reading, Berkshire.

This case is one where Holmes fails to bring the villains to justice.

Publication history
"The Adventure of the Engineer's Thumb" was first published in the UK in The Strand Magazine in March 1892, and in the United States in the US edition of the Strand in April 1892. The story was published with eight illustrations by Sidney Paget in The Strand Magazine. It was included in the short story collection The Adventures of Sherlock Holmes, which was published in October 1892.

Adaptations

Film and television
A silent short film adaptation was released in 1923 as part of the Stoll film series starring Eille Norwood as Holmes.

The story was adapted for an episode of the 1954–1955 television series Sherlock Holmes starring Ronald Howard as Holmes and Howard Marion Crawford as Watson. The episode was titled "The Case of the Shoeless Engineer" and the story was altered so that Hatherley loses a shoe rather than his thumb, and Stark and his co-conspirator are captured by Lestrade with the assistance of Holmes.

The story was additionally adapted for the TMS Entertainment anime series Sherlock Hound, specifically in the episode "A Small Client" (1984). The general gist of the story was retained, but contained several differences, namely Professor Moriarty being in charge of the counterfeiting instead of Stark (who is not present in the episode at all), and the case being brought to Hound's attention through the engineer's young daughter instead of the engineer himself, who is being kept prisoner for the majority of the episode.

The story was also adapted in the 1986 Soviet TV movie The Adventures of Sherlock Holmes and Dr. Watson – The Twentieth Century Approaches. There, the criminal (Col. Stark) is Eduardo Lucas from "The Adventure of the Second Stain", and the gang's work is economic sabotage by the German Empire. Upon hearing the details, Mycroft Holmes decides to balance the damage by producing an equal amount of counterfeit German currency.

An episode of the animated television series Sherlock Holmes in the 22nd Century was based on the story. The episode, also titled "The Adventure of the Engineer's Thumb", aired in 2001.

Radio

Edith Meiser adapted the story as an episode of the radio series The Adventures of Sherlock Holmes, which aired on 17 December 1931, starring Richard Gordon as Sherlock Holmes and Leigh Lovell as Dr. Watson. Another episode adapted from the story aired on 24 February 1935 (with Louis Hector as Holmes and Lovell as Watson).

Edith Meiser also adapted the story as an episode of the radio series The New Adventures of Sherlock Holmes, with Basil Rathbone as Holmes and Nigel Bruce as Watson, that aired on 20 October 1940. Other episodes in the same series that were adapted from the story aired in June 1943 and January 1948 (with John Stanley as Holmes and Alfred Shirley as Watson).

A radio adaptation aired on the BBC Light Programme in 1960, as part of the 1952–1969 radio series starring Carleton Hobbs as Holmes and Norman Shelley as Watson. It was adapted by Michael Hardwick.

"The Engineer's Thumb" was dramatized by Peter Mackie for BBC Radio 4 in 1991, as part of the 1989–1998 radio series starring Clive Merrison as Holmes and Michael Williams as Watson. It featured John Moffatt as Lysander Stark.

The story was adapted as an episode of the radio series The Classic Adventures of Sherlock Holmes, starring John Patrick Lowrie as Holmes and Lawrence Albert as Watson. The episode aired in 2015.

References 
 Notes

 Sources

External links

Engineer's Thumb, The Adventure of the
1892 short stories
 Works originally published in The Strand Magazine
Fiction set in 1889